The 2018–19 FA Cup (also known as the Football Association Challenge Cup) was the 138th edition of the oldest football tournament in the world. It was sponsored by Emirates and known as The Emirates FA Cup for sponsorship purposes. It started with the Extra Preliminary Round on the weekend of 11 August 2018 and concluded with the final on 18 May 2019.

Premier League side Chelsea were the defending champions, but they were eliminated by Manchester United in the fifth round on 18 February 2019 in a rematch of the previous season's final. Manchester City won their sixth FA Cup title and their first since 2011, making them the first English club to complete a domestic treble, having earlier won the EFL Cup and the Premier League.

Teams

Round and draw dates

Qualifying rounds

All of the competing teams that are not members of either the Premier League or English Football League competed in the qualifying rounds to secure one of 32 available places in the First Round Proper. The qualifying competition began with the Extra Preliminary Round on 11 August 2018. The fourth and final qualifying round was played over the weekend of 20 October 2018.

First round proper
The First Round draw took place on 22 October and was made by Dennis Wise and Dion Dublin. All 40 First Round Proper ties were to be played on the weekend of 10 November with 13 replays to be played on 20 and 21 November. 32 teams from the qualifying competition joined 48 teams from League One and League Two to compete in this round. This round included three teams from Level 7, the lowest-ranked teams still in the competition at that point: Metropolitan Police, Haringey Borough and Hitchin Town.

Second round proper

The Second Round draw took place on 12 November. The 40 winners of the First Round Proper played in 20 Second Round Proper ties on the weekend of 1 December. This round included five teams from Level 6 (Guiseley, Slough Town, Southport, Stockport County and Woking), who were the lowest-ranked teams still in the competition. This round included an all-Welsh tie, Wrexham at home against Newport County, the first such tie in the FA Cup since the latter took on Swansea City in the first round of the 2006–07 tournament.

Third round proper
The Third Round draw took place on 3 December 2018 and was broadcast live on BBC One and BT Sport before the final second round tie between Guiseley and Fleetwood Town. All 32 Third Round Proper ties took place on the weekend of 4–7 January 2019. A total of 64 clubs played in the third round; 20 winners of the second round, and 44 teams from the Premier League and EFL Championship entering in this round. This round included one team from Level 6, Woking, the lowest-ranked team still in the competition.

The scheduling for the third round was controversial, due to the number of games scheduled outside the traditional kick-off slot of 15:00 GMT on Saturday. Only 10 of 32 Third Round Proper matches kicked off at that time. This was a result of the FA signing a new overseas television deal in October 2016, which came into force this season. The new contract caused a number of matches to be moved to other time-slots to accommodate viewers outside the UK.

Fourth round proper
The draw for the Fourth Round took place on 7 January following the Southampton–Derby County game. It was shown on BBC and was conducted by Carl Ikeme and Robbie Keane. All 16 Fourth Round ties were played on the weekend of 25–28 January 2019. This round included one team from Level 5, Barnet, the lowest ranking and only non-League side left in the competition.

Fifth Round Proper
The draw for the Fifth Round took place on 28 January 2019. Matches were played on the weekend of 15–18 February 2019. This round included one team from Level 4, Newport County, the lowest ranking side left in the competition. As of this season, extra time and penalties replaced replays as the method for resolving a drawn tie.

Quarter-finals
The draw for the quarter-finals took place on 18 February 2019. Matches were played on the weekend of 16–17 March 2019. This round included two teams from Level 2, Millwall and Swansea City, the lowest ranking sides left in the competition.

Semi-finals
The draw for the semi-finals took place on 17 March 2019.

Final

The final was played on 18 May 2019 at Wembley Stadium, London.

Bracket
The following is the bracket which the FA Cup resembled. Numbers in parentheses next to the match score represent the results of a replay, except for the quarter-finals stage onwards. Numbers in parentheses next to the replay score represents the results of a penalty shoot-out except for the quarter-finals stage onwards.

Top scorers

Television rights
The following matches were broadcast live on UK television:

Notes

References

External links
 The official FA Cup website

 
FA Cup seasons
FA Cup
FA Cup